Community House, First Congregational Church is located in Eau Claire, Wisconsin. It was built in the Prairie School architectural style in 1914. On July 18, 1974, it was added to the National Register of Historic Places for its architectural significance.

References

Churches on the National Register of Historic Places in Wisconsin
Churches in Eau Claire, Wisconsin
Congregational churches in Wisconsin
Prairie School architecture in Wisconsin
Churches completed in 1914
National Register of Historic Places in Eau Claire County, Wisconsin
Purcell and Elmslie buildings